Basi is a native Ilocano fermented alcoholic beverage or wine made with sugarcane juice, particularly those produced in Northern Luzon particularly in Ilocos Region. This wine is processed in "burnay" (Ilocano earthen jar) or "tapayan".

Description
Basi is the local beverage of Ilocos in northern Luzon in San Ildefonso where it has been consumed since before the Spanish conquest.  In the Philippines, commercial basi is produced by first crushing sugarcane and extracting the juice.  The juice is boiled in vats and then stored in earthen jars (tapayan).  Once the juice has cooled, flavorings made of ground glutinous rice and duhat (java plum) bark or other fruits or barks is added.  The jars are then sealed with banana leaves and allowed to ferment for several years.  The resulting drink is pale red in color.  If fermented longer, it turns into suka or vinegar.

Preparation 
There are three general methods for preparing basi, which are the Ilocos Method, the La Union Method, and the Pangasinan Method. All of these methods make use of sugarcane juice, which is obtained by crushing one-year-old sugar cane stalks between wooden or iron rollers attached to a carabao with a long pole. Two types of basi are produced: the basing babae taste sweet and has lesser alcohol content and the basing lalaki taste dry, bitter, potently strong, and has high content of alcohol. Their difference lies in the concentration of sugarcane juice (babae, 29 to 33° Brix and lalaki, 27 to 28° Brix) and the additives added such as tangal (Ceriops tagal (Perr. C.B. Rob.) bark, green guava (Psidium guajava Linn.) leaves, duhat (Syzygium cumini linn.) bark, and fruits, bark and leaves of samac (Macharanga tanarius Linn. or M. grandifolia Linn.),

Ilocos 
Basi wines are produced in the province of Ilocos Norte, specifically in Laoag and the towns of Vintar, Sarrat, Piddig, and Batac, and in the province of Ilocos Sur, specifically in Bantay, San Ildefonso and Vigan. The Ilocos method differs from the La Union method in terms of the starter or inoculum used, as well as the additives used.

The first step in making Ilocos basi is to clean the sugarcane stalk and then press it to extract the juice; then add water to the juice; boil and add ground dry samac bark and leaves or gamu; then pour into an earthen jar or burnay and cover with thickly padded fresh samac leaves securely tied around the neck of the burnay. After 3 days, discard half of the gamu and replace it with parec (ground dry samac leaves and bark, powdered cardis seeds, and rice). Then comes the incubation process. In the Ilocos Basi method, there are two methods for fermentation. The first is place in permanent hole usually dug under the house or shed. Cover with soil, hermetically seal with a heavy flattened stone, and age for 3 to 12 months before harvesting. The second step is to seal the earthen cover with carabao dung and allow it to age for 3 to 12 months under the house or shed before harvesting.

La Union 
The La Union method is used specifically in the town of Naguilian. It consists of the preparation of bubod or starter, as well as the 24-hour binubudan (steamed rice plus starter), boiling sugarcane juice, and additives such as one year old lomboy (duhat) bark, tangal bark, and green guava leaves.

The first step is to clean the sugarcane stalk and then press it to get the juice; then add water to the juice; boil and add duhat and tangal bark and green guava leaves; pour in earthen jar or burnay; cover with banana leaves securely, tied around the neck of the burnay; cool (40-45 °C), add binubudan; incubation for 1 week then add powdered bubod or rusod; then ferment for one month and cover burnay with clean paper then earthen cover cemented with wood ashes and lastly age for 6 to 12 months and harvest it.

Pangasinan 
Pangasinan's  basi industry is not as well-known as those in La Union and Ilocos. The majority of those involved live in the town of Binalonan.

The method is similar to that used in the Ilocos region. The first step in making Pangasinan Basi is to clean the sugarcane stalk and then press it to get the juice; then add water to the juice; boil it and add grounded, dried samac bark; pour in earthen jar or burnay and cool it for 24 hours; then add grounded, dried samac fruits; cover with brown paper and plastic sheet securely tied around the neck of the burnay; age in shed or under the house for 3 to 9 months and harvest it.

Basi Revolt

The 1807 Basi Revolt in Piddig, Ilocos Norte, occurred when the Philippines' Spanish rulers effectively banned private manufacture of the beverage.

The Basi Revolt, also known as the Ambaristo Revolt, erupted on September 16, 1807, in the present-day town of Piddig, Ilocos Norte. Led by Pedro Mateo, a cabeza de barangay of Piddig, and Saralogo Ambaristo, an Ilocano and Tinguian, and composed of townspeople from Piddig, Badoc, Sarrat, Laoag, Sinait, Cabugao, Magsingal and other towns of Ilocos, they marched under their own flag of yellow and red horizontal bands and made their way southward towards the provincial capital of Vigan to protest against the abuses of the Spanish colonial government.

According to historical accounts, in 1786, people's frustration grew over the basi (the local beverage of the Ilocos) wine monopoly imposed by the Spanish colonial government that prohibited the private manufacture of basi, forcing Ilocanos to buy from government stores.

Even before the arrival of the Spaniards, basi was an important part of the Ilocanos' society and culture. Drinking basi played such a great importance in Ilocano culture; from marriage to childbirth and to death, it was a part of their ritual, tradition, and daily life. Basi was a major industry in the Ilocos region at the time, therefore in addition to the grief of Ilocanos had also lost their livelihood, in other words, they had been robbed of their happiness as well as an essential part of their culture and heritage.

Fueled by these abuses, people were prompted to start the uprising in Piddig town and later spread in the northern and southern towns of Ilocos province. On September 28, 1807, Ilocano forces on their way to the capital Vigan were assassinated by Spanish forces while crossing the Bantaoay River in San Ildefonso, Ilocos Sur, resulting in the deaths of hundreds of Ilocano forces. Those who survived the battle were hanged and their heads pierced with wooden poles and flagged by the Spaniards as a warning to anyone who wanted to strike and fight against the Spaniards.

The Basi Revolt lasted for 13 days. The series of unrest also led the colonial government to divide the province into the now Ilocos Norte and Ilocos Sur.

A Basi Festival is held annually in Naguilian, La Union. Basi Festival is held every first week of May in the town of Naguilian, La Union to celebrate the "basi". The festival mainly promotes Basi as a local product also Naguilian's one town, one product and the usual activities include street dancing, sport events, agri-trade fair & other amusement games.

Recently, the Sangguniang Bayan of San Ildefonso approved a resolution declaring September 16 as a non-working holiday and named the old road in Gongogong as Ambaristo street in honor of Pedro Ambaristo, leader of the Basi Revolt. Mayor Christian Purisima enrolled basi as their entry into the  "One Town; One Product" (OTOP) program of Ilocos Sur First District Representative DV Savellano.

Commercial production
Basi del Diablo Wines of the Salucop Group, Inc. started making basi in the year 1906, 99 years after the Basi Revolt. The light fermented sugarcane winemaker's most prominent product is the Ambaristo, named after the Basi Revolt hero Pedro Ambaristo.

Nagguilian Basi is another basi brand in the northern part of the Philippines. It is produced in Naguilian, La Union.

See also
Palek
Intus
Palm wine
Tapuy
Tapai
Tapayan

References

Fermented drinks
Philippine alcoholic drinks